Sergei Stanislavovich Kirsanov (born 16 December 1961) is a Russian football manager and a former player.

External links
 

1961 births
Living people
Soviet footballers
Association football forwards
FC Sibir Novosibirsk players
FC Zvezda Irkutsk players
FC Tom Tomsk players
FC Dynamo Barnaul players
FC Luch Vladivostok players
Russian footballers
Russian football managers
FC Sibir Novosibirsk managers
FC Novokuznetsk players